Declan John Edge (born 18 September 1965 in Malacca Town, Malaysia) is a former professional footballer who is the current manager of Swedish club Torslanda IK. Born in Malaysia to English parents, Edge represented the New Zealand national football team in the 1980s and 1990s.

Edge is considered one of the premier developers of footballing talent in New Zealand, acting as technical director for the Olé Football Academy and developing players such as Ryan Thomas and Tyler Boyd.

Playing career

International career
Edge made his full All Whites debut as a substitute in a 5–0 win over Fiji on 3 June 1985 and ended his international playing career with 26 A-international caps and 1 goal to his credit, his final cap an appearance in a 0–2 loss to England on 8 June 1991.

Coaching career
Tauranga City FC Assistant Coach
Melville United  Assistant Coach
Waikato FC
Western Suburbs
Ole Football Academy

Personal
Declan's nephew Jesse Edge is a former New Zealand youth international.

References

External links

1965 births
Living people
New Zealand association footballers
New Zealand international footballers
National Soccer League (Australia) players
Adelaide City FC players
Notts County F.C. players
Association football forwards